Abazi is a surname. Notable people with the surname include:

Hasan Abazi (born c. 1947), Kosovar trade unionist
Eduard Abazi (born 1968), Albanian footballer
Arsim Abazi (born 1972), Kosovar footballer and manager
Dren Abazi (born 1985), Kosovar singer
Leonit Abazi (born 1993), Kosovar footballer

See also
Abazai, a village and Union Council in Pakistan
Georgian abazi, a former unit of currency in Georgia